The Sarkies Brothers, Martin (1852–1912), Tigran (1861–1912), Aviet (1862–1923), and Arshak (1868–1931), were a group of brothers of Armenian ethnicity best known for founding a chain of luxury hotels throughout Southeast Asia. The brothers were born in Isfahan, Iran.

History 

23-year-old Tigran opened the Eastern Hotel (now Eastern & Oriental Hotel) in George Town, Penang on 15 April 1884. The brothers went on to found several hotels in the region, including the Raffles Hotel in Singapore, and the Strand Hotel in Rangoon (Yangon).

Arshak, the last of the brothers, died on January 9, 1931.  On June 10 of the same year, a bankruptcy case was filed against the Raffles Hotel, eventually resulting in the Sarkies family losing control of their hotels.

The Sarkies name still lives on in Singapore through the namesake Sarkies Road. However, the road was named after Regina Sarkies (née Carapiet), the wife of Arathoon Sarkies, who was a cousin of the brothers and fellow hotelier. In addition, Sarkies Corner, the coffee shop in the Eastern & Oriental Hotel, is named after the brothers. Arathoon's descendants continue to reside in Singapore.

Hotels

In chronological order, the hotels founded or run by the brothers were:
 1884: Eastern Hotel, George Town, Penang, Malaysia.
 1885: Oriental Hotel, George Town, Penang, Malaysia.  Previously the Hotel de l’Europe.
 1887: Raffles Hotel, Singapore.
 1889: Eastern & Oriental Hotel formed as a result of the renaming of the Oriental Hotel, and the selling of the Eastern Hotel.
 1901: Strand Hotel, Rangoon (Yangon), Burma (Myanmar). Sold by the brothers in 1925.
 1905: Crag Hotel, Penang Hill, Malaysia.  Sold to Federated Malay States Railways in 1925, abandoned in 1954.
 1923: Sea View Hotel, Singapore, originally built in 1906 and operated by the Sarkies Brothers under lease until 1931.  Closed in 1964, with original building demolished shortly thereafter.

In addition, Kartika Wijaya (originally Jambe Dawe) in Batu, Java, Indonesia was built in 1891 originally as a vacation villa for the Sarkies, and was later turned into a hotel. The brothers' cousin Arathoon Sarkies (1882–1932) also managed the Adelphi Hotel in Singapore from 1903 to 1908, while Hotel Majapahit (as Hotel Oranje) in Surabaya, Indonesia was founded in 1910 by Martin's son Lucas Martin Sarkies (1876–1941), which stayed in the hands of their descendants until 1969.

See also

References

External links
 the History of Armenians in Singapore and Malaysia

Hoteliers
Businesspeople from Isfahan
Armenian families
Armenian businesspeople
Persian Armenians
Armenian diaspora